New Profile is a movement for transforming Israeli society into a "civilian" one ("" – a term recently coined by parts of the Israeli left wing to highlight their view of the present society as "recruited" or "militarized"). It is a voluntary organization that acts against the compulsory law of military enlistment and supports people who refuse to enlist in the Israel Defense Forces. 
New Profile is a feminist organization and most of its activists are women. It was founded in 1998, among others by Rela Mazali.

Objectives
 Reducing the militarism in Israeli society.
 Resisting the Israeli occupation in the West Bank and Gaza Strip.
 Reducing the stigma of profile 21.
 Cancelling the law of compulsory enlistment to the Israeli military.
 Helping refuseniks or people who don't enlist in the army for other reasons.
 Supporting refusniks who are in army prison because of their refusal to enlist in the army or serve in the Occupied Territories.
 Educating the public.
 Recruiting lesbian women

Legal proceedings and criminal investigation
In September 2008, Israeli Attorney General, Menachem Mazuz, ordered the police to open a criminal investigation against New Profile because of allegations of "incitement to draft dodging" and helping people secure exemptions fraudulently.

On April 26, 2009, 8 New Profile activists were detained and the organization's computers were confiscated.

See also
Coalition of Women for a Just Peace
Refusal to serve in the IDF
Sarvanim
Profile 21

Notes

External links
New Profile official website
"The Cost of the Occupation to Israelis and Palestinians" - 2009 talk by New Profile activist Dorothy Naor
 Hugh Levinson, Dodging Israel's draft, BBC, November 11, 1999.
Peace organizations based in Israel
Non-governmental organizations involved in the Israeli–Palestinian conflict
Jewish anti-occupation groups
Feminist organizations in Israel
Conscription in Israel
Anti-conscription organizations